Ark, Iran may refer to:
 Ark, Bojnord, a village in Bojnord County, North Khorasan Province
 Ark, Fariman, a village in Fariman County, Razavi Khorasan Province
 Ark, Jajrom, a village in Jajrom County, North Khorasan Province
 Ark, Jowayin, a village in Jowayin County, Razavi Khorasan Province
 Ark, Qazvin, a village in Qazvin County, Qazvin Province
 Ark, South Khorasan, a village in Khusf County, South Khorasan Province

See also
 Ark (disambiguation)